Everybody's Got To is the third solo album by Australian guitarist and songwriter Ed Kuepper recorded in 1988 and released on the Hot label. The album was re-released in 2005 with four bonus tracks from Kuepper's Happy as Hell EP.

Reception
The Allmusic review by Dan LeRoy awarded the album 4½ stars and states "this set of tight, polished alt-rock was his best outing of the '80s, and is perhaps his finest album ever... Anyone wanting to explore Kuepper's substantial and often superb back catalog will find Everybody's Got To the perfect place to start".

Track listing
(All songs by Ed Kuepper)
 "Everybody's Got To" – 3:45
 "Too Many Clues" – 3:07
 "When There's This Party" – 3:04
 "Standing in the Cold, in the Rain" – 3:55
 "Lonely Paradise" – 4:11
 "Burned My Fingers" – 4:10
 "Not a Soul Around" – 2:46
 "Nothing Changes in My House" – 3:33
 "Spartan Spirituals" – 2:46
 "No Skin off Your Nose" – 4:30

2005 CD reissue bonus tracks
 "Sometimes" – 4:50 
 "Everything's Fine" – 3:13
 "Ghost of an Ideal Wife" – 4:03
 "New Bully in the Town" – 4:46

Charts

Personnel
Ed Kuepper – vocals, electric guitar, acoustic guitar
Mark Dawson – drums
Paul Smith – bass guitar
Rebecca Hancock – vocals, brass
Jim Bowman – keyboards
Peter Walsh - Background vocals

References

Hot Records albums
Ed Kuepper albums
1988 albums